Wassa East is one of the constituencies represented in the Parliament of Ghana. It elects one Member of Parliament (MP) by the first past the post system of election. Wassa East is located in the Mpohor/Wassa East District of the Western Region of Ghana.

Members of Parliament

References 

Parliamentary constituencies in the Upper West Region